A Wasser- und Schifffahrtsamt (WSA - Waterways and Shipping Office) is a federal German agency, responsible for the administration of federal navigable waters and for the regulation of vessel traffic. 

The thirty-nine offices are supervised by the national Wasser- und Schifffahrtsverwaltung des Bundes (WSV - Federal Waterways and Shipping Administration) and accountable to the Federal Ministry of Transport and Digital Infrastructure.  In total the offices cover 23,000 km² of maritime waters and 7,350 km of inland waterways.

WSA stations 
Each WSA has a defined geographical coverage. For example, WSA Lauenburg covers a section of the River Elbe together with tributaries and the Elbe-Lübeck Canal; WSA Cuxhaven covers the lower Elbe and an extensive sea area.

Service

Waterways 

In the ​​infrastructure, the waterways and shipping authorities perform the following sovereign tasks for the federal waterways and shipping administration:

 Maintenance and operation of the federal waterways and the federal shipping facilities (such as locks, weirs, operations centers, etc.)
 Police tasks
 Setting and operating of navigation signs
 water level documentation and information
 Icefighting (with own icebreakers)
The Administration operates a fleet of about a dozen icebreakers. The newest, the Keiler, was delivered in December 2011. Their oldest existing icebreaker, the Steinbock, was commissioned in 1935. They are diesel powered, with engines that produce . They cost 5 million Euros each. Other vessels include the Widder, Stier and the Wisent.

Inland navigation

According to the law on the tasks of the federal government in the field of inland navigation, the waterways and shipping offices perform the following sovereign tasks_
 Promotion of the inland fleet and inland waterway transport
 Defense against dangers to the safety and smoothness of traffic as well as the prevention of dangers emanating from shipping (shipping police) and harmful environmental effects within the meaning of the Federal Immission Control Act
 Granting permission for watercraft to travel on federal waterways

Sea navigation
 Promotion of the German merchant fleet and provision for maintaining the efficiency of the seaports
 Defense against dangers to the safety and smoothness of traffic as well as the prevention of dangers emanating from maritime shipping (shipping police) and harmful environmental effects within the meaning of the Federal Immission Control Act
 seaward of the boundary of the territorial sea, shipping police, averting dangers and eliminating disturbances to public security or order
 Measures to fulfill tasks incumbent on the federal government in the field of maritime shipping based on other regulations

See also 
Frankfurt (icebreaker)

References 

Water transport in Germany
Inland waterway authorities
Transport organisations based in Germany